Pathirana is a common Sinhalese surname. People with that name include:

Buddhika Pathirana, Sri Lankan politician
Jaya Pathirana, Sri Lankan politician and judge
Matheesha Pathirana, Sri Lankan cricketer
Nandasena Pathirana, Sri Lankan cricket umpire
Ramesh Pathirana, Sri Lankan politician
Richard Pathirana, Sri Lankan politician
R. P. A. Ranaweera Pathirana, Sri Lankan politician
Sachith Pathirana, Sri Lankan cricketer
Shehan Pathirana, Sri Lankan rugby player
Assassination of Daya Pathirana

See also
Barred danio (Devario pathirana), a species of fish

Sinhalese surnames